The Charles Stevens House is a historic residence in Astoria, Oregon, United States.

The house was entered onto the National Register of Historic Places in 1985.

See also
National Register of Historic Places listings in Clatsop County, Oregon

References

External links

1867 establishments in Oregon
Individually listed contributing properties to historic districts on the National Register in Oregon
Houses completed in 1867
Houses on the National Register of Historic Places in Astoria, Oregon
Italianate architecture in Oregon